K P "Ripper" Jayanandan (born 1968) is a serial killer from Thrissur (formerly Trichur) who is accused of seven murders committed during a span of 35 robberies, in and around Thrissur Ernakulam border areas. For the seven murders committed by Jayanandan, including the double murder at Perinjanam in October 2004, Thrissur principal sessions judge sentenced him to death by hanging in June 2008. He was sent to Poojapura Central Jail to await execution but escaped in June 2013. He was captured on 9 September 2013 near Thrissur.

Background
Jayanandan was born in Thrissur.

Major thefts and murders
Jayanandan's first major offence was burgling the house of 45-year-old Jose in Mala police station limits in September 2003. During the robbery, he struck Jose, who was sleeping, with a crowbar and killed him and decamped with Rs 17,000 and a video cassette player.

His second burglary was in March 2004, in which he forced his way into a house in Mala police station limits itself, killing 51-year-old Nabeesa who woke up hearing the noise and came out. Upon entering the house, he killed two more women, 23-year-old Fousiya and 28-year-old Noorjahan, and two children.

In a third burglary in October 2004, Jayanandan killed 64-year-old Kalapurackkal Sahadevan and his wife, 58-year-old Nirmala, in their house at Perinjanam, Thrissur district in Mathilakam police station limits, to steal 11.25 sovereigns of gold

His next attack was at a house in Kodungallur police station limits in Thrissur, in which he attacked Aravindaksha Panicker and wife Omana Panicker and caused grievous injuries to both, besides robbing 18-sovereign gold ornaments.

Jayanandan's next target was an outlet of Kerala State Beverages Corporation at North Paravoor in August 2005. When the security guard Subhashakan challenged him to rob the next house and take more money and 3 Video cassette player, Jayanandan struck him on the head with an iron rod and killed him.

Escape
The police suspect that the jailbreak occurred after midnight. The fugitives had cut through the cylindrical 'dead latch' of the padlocked cell's grilled door, possibly with a hacksaw blade, and scaled the relatively low wall of the block. (The wall had been fortified and topped with an electrified barbed wire fence in 2011 to house terror suspect Thadiyantavide Nazeer.) They proceeded to the prison's infirmary and stole bed sheets and clothes left out to dry on clothes lines.

The convicts hastily assembled a crude ladder from wooden poles to scale the wall. Once on top of the wall, they used a rope fashioned out of the knotted bed sheets and clothes to abseil down to the ground.
The escapees had made up their cots inside the cell with vessels and pillows to make it appear as if they were sleeping. The prison's extensive surveillance camera network was down at the time of the escape, purportedly due to a power outage.

Investigation
The escapade was a huge embarrassment for Kerala police as Jayanandan was a seasoned criminal and with multiple successful escape attempts made in past. The high security controls and technologies were breached by Jayanandan with very rudimentary scale

Capture
Jayanandan was arrested by the Kerala police in Nellayi, a few kilometres away from his native village in Thrissur on 9 September 2006. The police detained Jayanandan in the afternoon, while he was waiting to get his bicycle repaired at Nellayi junction.

Sources

See also
List of serial killers by country

External links
 
 

1968 births
21st-century criminals
Crime in Kerala
Escapees from Indian detention
Indian escapees
Indian people convicted of murder
Indian prisoners sentenced to death
Indian robbers
Indian serial killers
Living people
Male serial killers
People convicted of murder by India
People from Thrissur
People murdered in Kerala
Prisoners sentenced to death by India